Pseudodeltote coenia is a species of moth of the family Noctuidae first described by Charles Swinhoe in 1901. It is found in Taiwan.

The length of the forewings is 11–13 mm. The forewings are ochreous white, suffused with rufous and white and the hindwings are white, sparsely sprinkled with brown.

References

Moths described in 1901
Acontiinae